The Ministry of Information is the ministry responsible for the distribution of information in Lebanon.

List of ministers
 Ghazi Aridi (28 October 2000 2003, 19 July 2005 2008)
 Melhem Antoun Riachy (December 18, 2016 May 6, 2018)
 Jamal Al-Jarrah (January 31, 2019January 21, 2020)
 Manal Abdel Samad (January 21, 2020 August 9, 2020)
 George Kurdahi (September 10, 2021 December 3, 2021)
 Abbas Halabi (3 December 2021 – 10 March 2022) (Ad interim)
 Ziad Makary (10 March 2022 – present)

References

External links
 

Information
Lebanon, Information